ShapeShifter is freeware that allows users to create an animations online, without the need to download software. This animation software is free to use, and offers an opportunity to create cartoons without the need for expensive software and licenses. The software is part of the animation website aniboom.

Features
The software features four usable shapes; squares, triangles, circles, and half circles. Other tools include:
 Color
 Resizing and scaling shapes
 View outlines
 View onion skinning
 Adding Frames
 Playback of animation
 Saving Animation (AniBOOM account required)
 Changing the background color

Drawbacks
Given the nature of the software, creating an animation can become tedious or slow. Because of this, many animations are very short and lack detail but some users have created impressive animations using the application.

References

External links
 Shapeshifter Software Page

Web animation